Camp Lake National Wildlife Refuge is a  National Wildlife Refuge (NWR) in the U.S. state of North Dakota. The refuge is an Easement refuge that is entirely on privately owned land, but the landowners and U.S. Government work cooperatively to protect the resources. The U.S. Fish and Wildlife Service oversees Camp Lake NWR from offices at Audubon National Wildlife Refuge.

References

External links
 Audubon National Wildlife Refuge: About the Complex
 Oh Ranger: Camp Lake National Wildlife Refuge

Protected areas of McLean County, North Dakota
National Wildlife Refuges in North Dakota
Easement refuges in North Dakota